Elizabeth George (born 1944) is an American author and Christian speaker based in Seattle, Washington. She has authored over 80 books and gift books aimed mainly towards adult women and also young adults, teens, tweens, and children. She also co-authored 4 marriage books and 3 children's books with Jim George, her author husband.

Early life
George was born in Granite, Oklahoma 11 November 1944 to Richard Henry White and Ruth Harrison White. She graduated from College High School in Bartlesville, Oklahoma in 1962. She earned a Bachelor of Science in Education from The University of Oklahoma in 1966. Her first year out of college, George was a junior high and high school English and business teacher. She was also a Logos Bible Institute instructor and a Bible study lecturer and curriculum development team member at Grace Community Church in Sun Valley, California.

Writing
George began writing in the early 1990s. She authored her first book, Loving God with All Your Mind in 1994. Her 1997 release, A Woman After God's Own Heart, gave her exposure and credibility, which propelled her writing career and bestseller status. George has authored over 80 books since the mid-90s. To date, she has sold over 9 million books worldwide, translated into 19 languages.

Reception
George was the recipient of the Harvest House Gold Award in 2002 and the Harvest House Platinum Award in 2004. In 2008, A Woman After God's Own Heart spent 13 months on the CBA Top 50 Bestseller list, Christian Retailing Top 100 Bestsellers list, and the Wesley Owen Croydon Top 10 Bestsellers list. Following God with All Your Heart was ranked #47 on the ECPA Top 50 for one month in 2008. Breaking The Worry Habit…Forever! was ranked #33 on the ECPA Top 50 list for two months in 2009. A Girl After God's Own Heart launched at #1 in 2010 on the Evangelical Christian Publishers Association Top 50 Bestsellers list for 21 months and remained on bestseller lists for the following 36 months. It was also on the ECPA Young Adult Top 20 in 2010 and peaked at #1. A Girl's Guide to Making Really Good Choices was ranked third on the CBA Young Adult best sellers list in April 2013.

Personal life
George married Jim George on 1 June 1965 in Bartlesville, Oklahoma. The couple met while attending The University of Oklahoma. George graduated from The University of Oklahoma in 1966. Today the Georges live in Seattle, Washington and spend time writing in Hawaii. They have two grown daughters and eight grandchildren. George and her husband have co-authored four marriage books and three children's books.

Bibliography

See also
 Biblical patriarchy

References

External links
Elizabeth George's Homepage
Harvest House's Homepage

1944 births
Living people
20th-century American non-fiction writers
20th-century American women writers
20th-century evangelicals
21st-century American businesspeople
21st-century American non-fiction writers
21st-century American women writers
21st-century evangelicals
American evangelicals
American self-help writers
American women non-fiction writers
Christian novelists
Pentecostal writers
University of Oklahoma alumni
Writers from Oklahoma